The National Maritime Museum, Cornwall is located in a harbourside building at Falmouth in Cornwall, England. The building was designed by architect M. J. Long, following an architectural design competition managed by RIBA Competitions.

The museum grew out of the FIMI (Falmouth International Maritime Initiative) partnership which was created in 1992 and was the result of collaboration between the National Maritime Museum, Greenwich and the former Cornwall Maritime Museum in Falmouth. It opened in February 2003. It is an independent charitable trust and, unlike other national museums, receives no direct government support.

Its mission is to promote an understanding of boats and their place in people's lives, and of the maritime heritage of Cornwall. It does this by presenting the story of the sea, boats and the maritime history of Cornwall. It maintains the National Small Boats Register (NSBR).

Boats
The Museum manages the National Small Boat Collection, which came from the National Maritime Museum in Greenwich, in addition to its own collection of Cornish and other boats. Famous boats on show in its collection include:
Waterlily, a Thames steam boat built by Thornycrofts in 1866
Fricka, a gentleman's day sailor built by William Fife
Champions like the Ventnor planing hydrofoil; the Flying Dutchman Supercalifragilisticexpialidocious (Superdocious for short) in which Rodney Pattisson won a gold medal at the Mexico Olympics; Rita, the Finn in which Ben Ainslie won Olympic gold medals in 2004, 2008, and 2012; and "Defender II"
 Thunder and Lightning the International 14 which was the first boat to use a trapeze competitively
Early examples of popular sailing dinghies like Mirror No.1, Firefly No.1 and Dart No. 1
Curlew, the Falmouth Quay Punt in which Tim and Pauline Carr sailed to the Antarctic
Britannia rowboat, in which John Fairfax rowed across the Atlantik in 1969
Wanderer-W48, a Wayfarer (dinghy), in which Frank Dye sailed to Iceland and to Norway from Scotland (surviving four capsizes and a broken mast during a Force 9 storm) [Ref-7].

The museum is the country's premier museum for boats and maintains the National Small Boat Register (NSBR) of small boats (under 33-foot) and invites owners of historic craft to register them.

Cornwall's maritime history
Three galleries are devoted to the maritime history of Cornwall. These cover topics such as Cornish fishing, trading, boatbuilding, wrecks and emigration.

The Falmouth gallery also tells the story of: 
 The Packet ships which operated out of Falmouth and which took the mails to the growing empire from 1668 until 1851
 The life of Falmouth in the late 19th century when "to Falmouth for Orders" was a familiar instruction to ships' captains and the harbour was filled with vessels returning to Europe from around the world; and
 The 20th century when Falmouth was a jumping off point for D-Day and the first and last port of call for sailors like Robin Knox-Johnston, the first man to sail solo around the world, and Ellen MacArthur who broke the solo round the world sailing record having left from, and returned to the museum

Main galleries
 The Main Hall – containing the Survival Zone
 The Hold – with changing bi-annual exhibitions
 Look-out – with views over Falmouth harbour
 The Quarterdeck – used for temporary exhibitions and home to the Treasure Island Play Zone
 The Bridge – with changing exhibitions
 Boat building and its history
 Tidal Zone – with underwater views of Falmouth harbour
 Waterfront – the small indoor lake, with fans creating a gust for radio-controlled model yachts
 Pontoon – with a changing display of boats on the water
 Maritime Cornwall
 Falmouth Gallery
 Cornwall and the Sea
 Cornish Quayside

Exhibitions

The museum has a programme of annual exhibitions including titles such as:
2004 The Will to Win – an exhibition of Olympic and competitive boats
2005 Team Philips and Surf's Up – exhibitions about the round the world project and the history of surfing in the UK
2006 Endurance and Survival
2007 Mad Dogs, and Englishmen? – eccentric boats
2008 Under the Sea – diving and man's attempt to work under water
2009 Titanic, Honour and Glory
2010 Lighthouses – Life on the Rocks
2012 Search and Rescue – the work of the Rescue Services
2015 Viking Voyagers
2017 Tattoo: British Tattoo History Revealed and Bligh-Myth, Man and Mutiny
2018 Titanic Stories 
2020 Monsters of the Deep: Science fact and Fiction
Opening March 2023 - Pirates: Explore Beneath the Surface

There is also a programme of temporary exhibitions, talks and activities.

Other facilities
The museum has  a waterside café overlooking the harbour, a shop, space for temporary exhibitions, and the Sunley Lecture Theatre.

Bartlett Library
The Bartlett Library is the centre of the museum's research and provides answers on maritime matters for specialists and amateurs alike. As well as holding many of the original port records for Falmouth, it has over 16,000 books and a very large number of magazines, cuttings and illustrations.

Awards
The National Maritime Museum Cornwall has been nominated for and won a number of awards including:
2004 - nominated for a Silver Award for most outstanding environmental design
2005 - ADAPT Trust Awards for Excellence in Access for Disabled People
2013 - Silver Award for Best UK Heritage Attraction at British Travel Awards
2014 - Best Museum in Cornwall - Cornwall Today Awards
2014 - Silver Award for Best UK Heritage Attraction at British Travel Awards
2014 - Marsh Trust Award
2014 - Learning outside the classroom quality badge
2014 - Winner of The Telegraph Family Friendly Museum Award
2015 - Winner of the Sandford Award for outstanding quality of education work
2017 - Best Gallery - What's On Cornwall Awards
2021 - Silver in the Cornwall Tourism Awards
2021 - Winner of the Sandford Award for outstanding quality of education work

References

External links
 NMMC website

Buildings and structures in Falmouth, Cornwall
Maritime museums in England
Museums in Cornwall
Charities based in Cornwall
Cornish culture
MJ Long buildings